Sampayo is a surname. Notable people with the surname include:

Ben Sampayo (born 1992), British footballer
Carlos Sampayo (born 1943), Argentine writer
Ramón Sampayo Ortiz (born 1957), Mexican politician